The 1918 Vermont gubernatorial election took place on November 5, 1918. Incumbent Republican Horace F. Graham, per the "Mountain Rule", did not run for re-election to a second term as Governor of Vermont. Republican candidate Percival W. Clement defeated Democratic candidate William B. Mayo to succeed him.

Republican primary

Results

Democratic primary

Results

General election

Results

References

Vermont
1918
Gubernatorial
November 1918 events